Thunderbolt is the twenty-second studio album by British heavy metal band Saxon, released on 2 February 2018.

Background
On 14 September 2016, the band revealed they had begun working on a new album through their Facebook account. A month later, frontman Biff Byford revealed they had written a song dedicated to Motörhead called "They Played Rock n Roll", following the death of frontman Lemmy on 28 December 2015, which ended the band's 40-year history. The song is stylistically similar and referenced their touring companionship on the 1979/1980 "Bomber" tour.

In an interview alongside Airbourne frontman Joel O'Keeffe at 2017's Metal Hammer Golden Gods Awards, Byford confirmed that the album's title would be Thunderbolt and that the inspiration for it came from the gods of Greek mythology.

Further details were revealed on various stops on their autumn tour of the US and Canada. In an interview at their Newton, New Jersey show on 22 September, he revealed that he'd finished recording his vocals on 20 September. In an interview at their Montreal, Canada show on 4 October, Byford revealed that long-time producer Andy Sneap had finished mixing the album the previous day and mentioned a release date of 21 January 2018 (which later turned out to be incorrect).

On 7 November 2017, the band confirmed the title and revealed the release date of 2 February 2018, track list, artwork and a short UK/European tour alongside Diamond Head, with Magnum and Rock Goddess supporting on select UK dates.

On 30 November 2017, the new video "Thunderbolt" was released. The Record and especially the Motörhead Tribute Song on the Album, They Played Rock N Roll, is especially dedicated to former Motörhead guitarist Fast Eddie Clarke who died the previous month from Pneumonia and Chronic Obstructive Pulmonary Disease on 10th of January 2018, just a month before Thunderbolt Albums release.  On 19 September 2018, the "Predator" video was released.

Track listing
All music composed by Biff Byford, Doug Scarratt, Nigel Glockler, Paul Quinn, Nibbs Carter.

Credits
Biff Byford – vocals
Paul Quinn – guitars
Doug Scarratt – guitars
Nibbs Carter – bass
Nigel Glockler – drums

Additional Musicians
Seb Byford – backing vocals on "Thunderbolt" and "Speed Merchants"
Tom Witts – backing vocals on "Thunderbolt" and "Speed Merchants"
Caleb Quaye – backing vocals on "Thunderbolt" and "Speed Merchants"
Corvin Bahn – keyboards on "Nosferatu (The Vampire's Waltz)"
Johan Hegg – harsh vocals on "Predator"

Production
Billy Lee – photography
Steph Byford – artwork (additional)
Gestaltungskommando Buntmetall – layout, design
Paul Raymond Gregory – cover art
Andy Sneap – producer, engineering, mixing

Charts

References

2018 albums
Albums produced by Andy Sneap
Saxon (band) albums
Nosferatu